Theodore Dru Alison Cockerell (1866–1948) was an entomologist and systematic biologist who published nearly 4,000 papers, some of them only a few lines long. Cockerell’s speciality was the insect order Hymenoptera (bees and wasps), an area of study where he described specimens from the United States, the West Indies, Honduras, the Philippines, Africa, and Asia. Cockerell named at least 5,500 species and varieties of bees and almost 150 genera and subgenera, representing over a quarter of all species of bees known during his lifetime. In addition to his extensive studies of bees, he published papers on scale insects, slugs, moths, fish scales, fungi, roses and other flowers, mollusks, and a wide variety of other plants and animals.

Personal life

Cockerell was born in Norwood, Greater London, and died in San Diego, California.

He married Annie Sarah Fenn in 1891 (she died in 1893) and Wilmatte Porter in 1900. In 1901, he named the ultramarine blue chromodorid Mexichromis porterae (now Felimare porterae) in her honor. After their marriage in 1900, they frequently went on collecting expeditions together and assembled a large private library of natural history films, which they showed to schoolchildren and public audiences to promote the cause of environmental conservation.

After his death he was buried in Columbia Cemetery in Boulder, Colorado.

Professional life
Between 1891 and 1901, Cockerell was the curator of the public museum of Kingston, Jamaica, professor of entomology of the New Mexico Agricultural Experiment Station. In 1900–03, he was an instructor in biology at the New Mexico Normal School. While there, he taught and mentored Charlotte Cortlandt Ellis. 

In from 1904 to 1904, Cockerell was the curator of the Colorado College Museum and, in 1904, he became a lecturer on entomology and in 1906 professor of systematic zoology, at the University of Colorado, where he worked with Junius Henderson in establishing the University of Colorado Museum of Natural History. During World War II, he operated the Desert Museum in Palm Springs, California.

In 1912, Cockerell first described the Megachile zexmeniae, a species of leafcutter bee.

Publications
Cockerell was author of more than 2,200 articles in scientific publications, especially on the Hymenoptera, Hemiptera and Mollusca, and on paleontology and various phases of evolution, plus some 1,700 other works, including treatises on social reform and education. He was one of the most prolific taxonomists in history, publishing descriptions of over 9,000 species and genera of insects alone, some 6,400 of which were bees and some 1,000 mollusks, arachnids, fungi, mammals, fish and plants.

This includes descriptions of numerous fossil taxa, such as the landmark study, Some Fossil Insects from Florissant, Colorado (1913).

In an obituary note that appeared in the Nature on February 14, 1948, R.B. Benson observed that Cockerell "acquired the habit of hurrying his ideas and observations into print as soon as he could. The habit  persisted throughout his long life, so that almost all his work appeared in the form of short papers."

Plants
Cockerell and Wilmatte traveled to the United Kingdom in 1921. While there, they visited the Royal Botanic Garden Edinburgh where, according to himself in 1937, Isaac Bayley Balfour proved that the plant Primula ellisiae was a distinct species from P. rusbyi. He had named this taxon in honor of its discoverer, one of his students, Charlotte Cortlandt Ellis. However, at present this taxon is regarded as a synonym of P. rusbyi.

Honors
A dormitory in the Engineering Quad at the University of Colorado at Boulder and the moth Givira theodori are named in his honor.

Taxa
Taxa named by Cockerell include:

References

Further reading

External links

 Biography of Cockerell
 GAP Biography
 
 
 
 

1866 births
1948 deaths
British emigrants to the United States
American zoologists
American entomologists
Hymenopterists
American curators
American science writers
University of Colorado faculty
New Mexico Highlands University faculty